John Reginald Meese (17 July 1927 – 7 October 2005) was an Australian rules footballer who played with Collingwood in the Victorian Football League (VFL).

Notes

External links 

Reg Meese's playing statistics from The VFA Project
Reg Meese's Profile on Collingwood Forever

1927 births
2005 deaths
Australian rules footballers from Victoria (Australia)
Collingwood Football Club players
Preston Football Club (VFA) players